The fifth season of the American television drama series Mad Men premiered on March 25, 2012, with a two-episode premiere, and concluded on June 10, 2012. It consisted of thirteen episodes, each running approximately 48 minutes in length. AMC broadcast the fifth season on Sundays at 10:00 pm in the United States. The fifth season was released on DVD and Blu-ray in region 1 on October 16, 2012.

Season 5 takes place between Memorial Day (May 30) 1966 and spring 1967. The season explores Don Draper's new marriage to Megan, which leads him to ignore his work at the Sterling Cooper Draper Pryce advertising agency. Meanwhile, Lane, Pete, Roger, Joan, and Peggy learn that it is "every man for himself" in their personal and professional lives, as they each face painful new beginnings.

Cast

Main cast
 Jon Hamm as Don Draper
 Elisabeth Moss as Peggy Olson
 Vincent Kartheiser as Pete Campbell
 January Jones as Betty Francis
 Christina Hendricks as Joan Harris
 Jared Harris as Lane Pryce
 Aaron Staton as Ken Cosgrove
 Rich Sommer as Harry Crane
 Kiernan Shipka as Sally Draper
 Jessica Paré as Megan Draper
 Christopher Stanley as Henry Francis
 Jay R. Ferguson as Stan Rizzo
 Robert Morse as Bert Cooper
 John Slattery as Roger Sterling

Recurring cast

Guest stars
 Talia Balsam as Mona Sterling
 Michael Gladis as Paul Kinsey
 Ronald Guttman as Emile Calvet
 Zosia Mamet as Joyce Ramsay
 Joel Murray as Freddy Rumsen
 Samuel Page as Greg Harris
 Jay Paulson as Adam Whitman
 Myra Turley as Katherine Olson

Plot
Don Draper has married his secretary Megan Calvet, who throws a surprise birthday party for Don and their co-workers. Don is embarrassed by the party and Megan serenading him in front of his co-workers. Megan (who has been promoted to copywriter) meanwhile struggles with Don's growing detachment with work, as he is constantly having Megan come in late and leave early to the agency, and her own unfulfilled dream of being an actress. Don's detachment alienates Peggy, who is being made to train Megan, and Bert, who feels that Don has gone "on love leave", not caring about his job or turning in quality work.

Feeling her chances at work have been undercut by Don's detachment, the couple have a fight while touring a Howard Johnson's hotel. Don leaves Megan behind in a huff when she tells him that she's come to find the advertising industry hollow and superficial. But as he's driving home, he rethinks leaving her behind and goes back to the Howard Johnson, only to find Megan isn't there. He waits around for 7 hours and then drives home, where he finds Megan. She hitched a ride to the Greyhound bus station and then a cab back to their new apartment, where they fight and ultimately reconcile. 

Don's slacking at work coincides with the arrival of a new hire, in the form of young advertising phenom Michael Ginsberg. Young, aggressive, and anti-social, Ginsberg proves to be a rival for Don and Peggy. When the two are made to pitch advertisements for a snow cone company, Don purposely leaves behind Ginsberg's child-friendly campaign material in order to pitch his own darker, devil-themed campaign instead, which is ultimately chosen. Meanwhile, Peggy finds herself reaching a glass ceiling with regards to Ginsberg being able to rise faster within the company. However, one evening Ginsberg confides his dark secret to Peggy: that he was born in a Nazi concentration camp for Jews, where his mother died and that he spent his first five years in an orphanage before his father found him and took him to America to live. By the end, Peggy decides to leave the agency for another firm in order to fulfill her full potential. Don attempts to keep her by offering her a raise but ultimately concedes that Peggy has to leave him to continue out of his shadow. Before she leaves the office forever, Don kisses her hand, finally realizing how important she was to him. Peggy also makes a new change at home: she accepts her boyfriend's proposal to live together, to her mother's disapproval. 

Roger struggles to remain relevant in the company as Pete Campbell schemes to steal his plush office for himself. Roger begins to secretly pay Peggy and Ginsberg to produce material for him to pitch to clients. He also experiments with LSD, which has a profound impact on him and his own marriage to Jane; under the influence of the drug the two confess that their marriage has failed and they divorce. Roger meanwhile begins pursuing an affair with Megan's mother, including Don's daughter Sally catching her step-grandmother performing oral sex on Roger. 

Pete Campbell, having moved to the suburbs, begins to become more and more detached from his life and starts missing the big city. His relationship with Lane Pryce collapses and the two fight, with Lane beating Pete up in front of the other partners. He also begins a relationship with Beth Dawes, the wife of a fellow train commuter, who later breaks off the affair out of guilt even though she and Pete know that her husband is unrepentant in his own adultery. She later tells Pete that her husband is forcing her to undergo electroshock therapy because of her manic depression. Pete visits his mistress one last time in the hospital, whose memories of the affair have been destroyed. He confronts Beth's husband later on the train, revealing the affair and culminating in a fist fight. Returning home defeated and alone, his wife Trudy agrees to allow Pete to rent an apartment in the city for overnight stays.

Joan struggles with single motherhood while her husband is overseas, with help from her mother. However, when she discovers that Greg has signed up for another tour of duty in the Army Medical Corps without consulting her, Joan confronts Greg and in the process denounces him for his earlier rape of her and orders him out of her and their son's life. Greg reluctantly agrees but then files for divorce, which upsets Joan as she fears that Greg will paint her as the villain in their divorce case. Further complicating things is the firm's pursuit of Jaguar as a client, as Pete is able to get a promise that the agency will get the account if Joan sleeps with the head of the Jaguar dealers' association. Pete arranges a vote behind Don's back, and the other partners reluctantly agree to pay Joan to have sex with the executive to secure the account for them. However, Lane convinces Joan to take an ownership percentage of the company instead as Don tries to stop Joan from doing the deed. The firm wins the account, but alienates Joan and Don from the rest of the partners and from each other.          

Lane Pryce struggles with his own demons as he is revealed to be greatly in debt and owing a good amount of taxes from when he moved his money to the US last season to help keep the firm afloat. When his scheme to use his Christmas bonus to pay off his tax debt fails, Lane is forced to steal from the company to pay his debt. Don discovers this and asks Lane for his resignation, who then kills himself rather than face the disgrace of resigning and returning to England. He hangs himself in his office, leaving Roger, Pete, and Don to cut him down. Nobody but Don knows the reason behind his suicide. Don takes it especially hard and has hallucinations of his brother Adam, who also committed suicide by hanging. In some ways, Don blames himself for both deaths.
      
Megan (who has returned to acting) seeks Don's help to secure a commercial role for her. Megan's visiting mother cruelly denounces Megan's ambitions and tells Don that he should not help Megan, as she believes that Megan's dream of acting must be crushed and that she should behave like the proper wife of a wealthy man. While Don is at the dentist, Megan's mother reduces her daughter to a quivering wreck, resulting in Don agreeing to help Megan get the role in order to secure her the happiness she needs to function. Eventually, she gets the role, and after dropping her off at the studio, Don leaves to a bar where he sits by himself and orders a drink. 

The season ends with a montage of all the main characters having realizations about themselves. Pete, in the aftermath of his affair with Beth, is seen sitting alone on his couch with his headphones on and eyes closed. Peggy, having quickly risen through the ranks in her new career, is shown toasting a single glass of champagne to herself with a smile on her face. A naked Roger looks out the window of his hotel room at the city, in the throes of an LSD trip, and raises both of his arms into the air. And lastly, Don is seen at the bar, where a woman begins to flirt with him and asks if he is alone. He turns and looks at her ambiguously.

Episodes

Production

Crew
Series creator Matthew Weiner also served as showrunner and executive producer, and is credited as a writer on 10 of the 13 episodes of the season, often co-writing the episodes with another writer. Erin Levy was promoted to co-producer and wrote two episodes. Victor Levin joined as co-executive producer and wrote two episodes. Frank Pierson joined as consulting producer and wrote one episode. Semi Chellas was promoted to co-producer and wrote two episodes. Jonathan Igla wrote two episodes. Writing team Andre Jacquemetton and Maria Jacquemetton were promoted to executive producers and co-wrote one episode together. Other producers included Blake McCormick and executive producer Scott Hornbacher.

Jennifer Getzinger, Scott Hornbacher, Michael Uppendahl, and Phil Abraham each directed two episodes for the season. The remaining episodes were directed by Matt Shakman, cast member John Slattery, Matthew Weiner, who directs each season finale; with cast member Jon Hamm and cinematographer Christopher Manley each making their directorial debuts.

Reception
The fifth season of Mad Men has received critical acclaim. Review aggregator Rotten Tomatoes reports that 97% of 34 critics have given the season a positive review. The site's consensus is: "With its brilliantly crafted characters, razor-sharp writing, and ambitious sweep, Mad Men continues to surprise and unsettle." On Metacritic, the fifth season has scored an 89 out of 100 based on 24 reviews, indicating universal acclaim.

Accolades
The fifth season received three nominations from the Television Critics Association Awards for Program of the Year and Outstanding Achievement in Drama, while Jon Hamm was nominated for Individual Achievement in Drama.

64th Primetime Emmy Awards
Season five received 17 nominations for the 64th Primetime Emmy Awards, although it did not win any.
 Outstanding Drama Series
 Outstanding Lead Actor in a Drama Series: Jon Hamm
 Outstanding Lead Actress in a Drama Series: Elisabeth Moss
 Outstanding Supporting Actor in a Drama Series: Jared Harris
 Outstanding Supporting Actress in a Drama Series: Christina Hendricks
 Outstanding Guest Actor in a Drama Series: Ben Feldman
 Outstanding Guest Actress in a Drama Series: Julia Ormond
 Outstanding Directing for a Drama Series: Phil Abraham for "The Other Woman"
 Outstanding Writing for a Drama Series:
 Semi Chellas and Matthew Weiner for "Far Away Places"
Semi Chellas and Matthew Weiner for "The Other Woman"
 Andre Jacquemetton and Maria Jacquemetton for "Commissions and Fees"
Outstanding Art Direction for a Single-Camera Series
 Outstanding Casting for a Drama Series
 Outstanding Cinematography for a One Hour Series
Outstanding Hairstyling for a Single-Camera Series
Outstanding Makeup for a Single-Camera Series (Non-Prosthetic)
 Outstanding Single-Camera Picture Editing for a Drama Series

References

External links
 
 

2012 American television seasons
 
Television series set in 1966
Television series set in 1967